Claudio Caligari (7 February 1948 – 26 May 2015) was an Italian director and screenwriter.

Life and career 
Born in Arona, Piedmont, Caligari began his career as a documentarist, often collaborating with Franco Barbero; his first work was Perché droga (1975). He made his feature film debut in 1983, with the drug-centered drama Toxic Love, which won the De Sica Award at the 40th Venice International Film Festival. Only fifteen years later he directed another work, the neo-noir The Scent of the Night. He completed the editing of his third and last film, Non essere cattivo, a few days before his death from a tumour.

Filmography 
Director and Writer
Lotte nel Belice (1977)
Toxic Love (Amore tossico) (1983)
The Scent of the Night (L'odore della notte) (1998)
Don't Be Bad (Non essere cattivo) (2015)

References

External links 
 

1948 births
2015 deaths
20th-century Italian people
Italian film directors
Italian screenwriters
People from Arona, Piedmont
Deaths from cancer in Lazio
Italian male screenwriters